The Gift is an Australian observational documentary television program that aired on the Nine Network at , Thursdays. It was narrated by 60 Minutes journalist Tara Brown. The Gift explores the stories and importance of organ donation in Australia. A second series aired at 9:00pm Wednesdays, debuting on 12 August 2009.

Australian medical television series
Nine Network original programming
2007 Australian television series debuts
2009 Australian television series endings
Television series by Fremantle (company)

References